Cross Country Inn was an American motel chain founded in 1988 by Don Kenney. It had more than 30 locations in the Midwestern United States at its peak.

In 2003, Kenney sold the chain's assets. The last of the motels was sold in 2005.

See also
 List of motels

References

Hotels established in 1988
Hotels disestablished in 2005
Defunct companies based in Ohio
Defunct hotel chains
Motels in the United States